Monomorphichnus is an arthropod trace fossil known from the base of the Cambrian period onwards, before the first trilobite fossils.

References

Arthropod trace fossils